Xiehouyu is a kind of Chinese proverb consisting of two elements: the former segment presents a novel scenario while the latter provides the rationale thereof. One would often only state the first part, expecting the listener to know the second. Compare English "an apple a day (keeps the doctor away)" or "speak of the devil (and he doth/shall appear)".

Xiēhòuyǔ is translated as "enigmatic folk simile; truncated witticism; pun" (Wenlin 2016). In this case the second part is derived from the first through one meaning, but then another possible meaning of the second part is taken as the true meaning. To create examples in English, one can say "get hospitalized" to mean "be patient", or "small transactions only" to mean "no big deal". Thus a xiēhòuyǔ in one dialect can be unintelligible to a listener speaking another. Valuable linguistic data can sometimes be gleaned from ancient xiēhòuyǔ.

The origin of Xiehouyu

Xiēhòuyǔ is a special form of language created by the Chinese working people since ancient times. It is a short, funny and figurative sentence. It consists of two parts: the former part acts as a "lead", like a riddle, and the latter part plays the role of "back lining", which is like a riddle, which is quite natural. In a certain language environment, usually the first half, "rest" to the second half, can understand and guess its original meaning, so it is called "xiēhòuyǔ" ("saying with the latter part suspended").

Examples

  / 
 pinyin: wàishēng dǎ dēnglong—zhào jiù
 translation: Nephew handling a lantern — illuminating his uncle/according to the old [way])
 gloss: as usual, as before
 Note: 舅 and 舊/旧 are homophones, and 照 means "according to" as well as "to illuminate"

  / 
 pinyin: huángdì de nǚér—bù chóu jià
 translation: The daughter of the emperor — need not worry that she cannot soon be wed
 gloss: someone or something that is always wanted

  / 
 pinyin: lǐyú chī shuǐ——tūntūn tǔtǔ
 translation: Carp drinks eater - swallow and spit
 gloss: speaking hesitantly
 Note: 吞吞吐吐 (swallow and spit) is used describe someone speaking hesitantly

  / 
 pinyin: èrwàn wǔqiān lǐ chángzhēng —— rènzhòngdàoyuǎn 
 translation: 25000 Li (unit) long Long March - arduous journey

  / 
 pinyin: Lúgōuqiáo shang shí shīzi - shǔ bù qīng 
 translation: Stone lions on Lu Gou Bridge - uncountably many
 gloss: A very large amount.
 Note: There are numerous stone lions on Lu Gou Bridge.

  / 
 pinyin: cháhú lǐ zhǔ jiǎozi — yǒu kǒu dào bù chū 
 translation: Cooking dumplings in a tea kettle — cannot be poured out despite having an opening
 gloss: unable to say something
 Note: 口 can mean both "opening" and "mouth".

  / 
 pinyin: chuántóu shang pǎo mǎ —— zǒutóuwúlù
 translation: Riding a horse on the ship's bow — nowhere to go

  / 
 pinyin: dǎ pò shāguō —— wèn dào dǐ
 translation: break a pot - cracks to the bottom
 gloss: Insists to get to the bottom of a question or problem
 Note: 璺 (means cracks) and 问/問 (means ask) have the same pronunciation

  / 
 pinyin: dī shuǐ shí chuān —— fēi yírì zhī gōng 
 translation: Water drops penetrates stone - not done in one day

  / 
 pinyin: diàn xiàn gǎn shàng bǎng jī máo —— hǎo dà de dǎn (dǎn) zi 
 translation: Tying chicken feathers on power pole — what a big feather duster
 gloss: Being cocky
 Note: 掸子 (duster) and 胆子 (guts) have the same pronunciation

  / 
 pinyin: fènkēng lǐ de shítou —— yòu chòu yòu yìng 
 translation: stone in the cesspit — smelly and hard
 gloss: To describe someone being stubborn
 Note: 又臭又硬 literally means "smelly and hard", but is also used to say someone is stubborn

  / 
 pinyin: jiǎo cǎi liǎng zhī chuán —— yáo bǎi bú dìng
 translation: Each foot stepping on one boat - swinging back and forth
 gloss: Unable to make a decision
 Note: 摇摆/搖擺不定 literally means "swinging back and forth", but is also used to express a situation where a decision is tough to be made

  / 
 pinyin: lǎohǔ de pìgu —— mō bù dé
 translation: Tiger's butt - mustn't touch

  / 
 pinyin: huángshǔláng gěi jī bàinián —— búhuáihǎoyì 
 translation: A Siberian weasel wishing Happy New Year to a chicken — harboring no good intention.

  / 
 pinyin: ròu bāozi dǎ gǒu —— yǒuqùwúhuí
 translation: hitting a dog by throwing meat dumplings — gone, never returns

  / 
 pinyin: shǒuliúdàn zhà máofáng – jī qǐ gōngfèn (fèn)
 translation: Throwing grenade into a public toilet — stirring up public anger
 Note: 愤/憤 (anger of the public) and 粪/糞 (feces) have the same pronunciation

See also 
 Anapodoton
 Chengyu: Chinese "set phrases" reflecting conventional wisdom
 Homophonic puns in Mandarin Chinese
 Proverbs commonly said to be Chinese

References 

 Rohsenow, John Snowden. A Chinese-English dictionary of enigmatic folk similes (xiēhòuyǔ). Tucson: University of Arizona Press, 1991.
 Encyclopedia of China. First Edition. Beijing; Shanghai: Encyclopedia of China Publishing House. 1980–1993.

External links 

A collection of xiehouyu (archived page)

Chinese proverbs
Riddles